Khuda Aur Muhabbat is a Pakistani spiritual-romantic drama series that aired on Geo Entertainment, 2011. It is based upon novel of the same name written by Hashim Nadeem. Imran Abbas Naqvi and Sadia Khan are featured as the lead role in the first season

Plot

Season 1 

Khuda Aur Mohabbat's season1 has a spiritual-love story of two star-struck lovers. Hammad belongs to an elite family and has recently completed his Bachelor's in Commerce. Hammad's strange encounter with Imaan, the daughter of Moulvi Aleemuddin, brings an immense change in his life. Hammad's love at first sight with Imaan eventually leads him to leave his family and his lavish lifestyle as he struggles to be accepted by Imaan's family. After leaving his house, Hammad takes a job at a porter which requires hard labour. In the quest to be suitable for Imaan, Hammad finds spirituality and the true meaning of religion along the way. Despite Hammad's efforts, Moulvi Aleem refuses to understand the idea of love marriage and is unable to forgive Hammad for being in love with Imaan. Due to family pressure, Imaan is forced to marry her cousin Abdullah and begs Hammad to return to his own family. Hammad unable to subside his affection for Imaan is adamant on marrying her. Under nerve-racking circumstances and constant tribulations, Imaan, unable to disobey her father and concurrently feeling sympathy for Hammad, falls critically ill. Meanwhile, Hammad constantly disagrees to return to his home, further aiding in the helplessness felt by Imaan.

Season 2 

In the aftermath, Imaan is unable to recover from the burden on her heart and eventually dies. Hammad, left shocked by this incident goes into paralysis.

Season 3 

Two new characters are introduced, Farhad and Mahi who hail from completely different economic and cultural backgrounds. Mahi, who comes from an influential family, must adhere to the conventions and requirements of her family’s class despite her true jovial nature. Farhad on the other hand belongs to a small town and is instantly drawn to the charismatic Mahi and soon forsakes everything for her. Though Mahi appreciates Farhad’s efforts, she does not have the same feelings for him. In the quest to win Mahi’s heart, Farhad finds himself forming a special bond with his creator and becomes a devotee of love.

Cast & Characters

Series Overview

Production

Development and Casting

Season 2 
It was confirmed that season 2 of the series is in development and will be released in late 2016. Syed Ali Raza Usama was reported to direct the season while Imran Abbas and Sadia Khan confirmed returning as Hammad and Imaan. Later on, Kubra Khan also joined the cast as parallel lead. When asked about the plot of this season, Abbas clarified that the season will repeat the events of first season however they are more detailed this time.

Season 3 
Babar Javed announced the next season with Imran returning. However it was revealed that Babar was replaced by Abdullah Kadwani as Head of the network. Abdullah revamped the whole project by casting Feroze Khan, Iqra Aziz as lead actors for the season with Syed Wajahat Hussain, directing the season, produce under Abdullah's own production house, 7th Sky Entertainment. Besides Feroze and Iqra, Junaid Khan, Tooba Siddiqui, Sunita Marshall, Asma Abbas and Rubina Ashraf were also reportedly going to join the cast. On September 1, 2020. Feroze posted a pictures on his social media from the sets of the series revealing his character look in the season. The first teaser was released on January 1, 2021 at 08:00pm (PST).

Shooting locations

Soundtracks

Season 1
The original soundtrack of Khuda Aur Mohabbat's season 1 was sung by Ahmed Jahanzeb while the lyrics were penned by producer, Javeria Saud.

Season 2
The original soundtrack of Khuda Aur Mohabbat's season 2 is composed and sung by Ahmed Jahanzeb and Rahat Fateh Ali Khan and Afshan Fawad while the lyrics are penned down by the producer Javeria Saud.

Season 3
The original soundtrack of Khuda Aur Mohabbat's season 3 was released on January 29, 2021 at 08:00pm (PST). The OST is composed by Naveed Nashad and lyrics are penned down by Qamar Nashad and it is sung by Rahat Fateh Ali Khan and Nish Asher. It achieved more than million views within 15 hours. It currently has over 125million views on YouTube, making it Geo's most popular video on YouTube.

Accolades

Lux Style Awards

Season 1
 Best Original Soundtrack-Ahmed Jahanzeb-Nominated

Season 2
 Best TV Actor-Imran Abbas-Nominated

Season 3

References

External links 

Khuda Aur Muhabbat
2011 Pakistani television series debuts
2011 Pakistani television series endings
Urdu-language television shows
Pakistani television series
Geo TV original programming
Pakistani drama television series